Folia is a well-known, simple musical framework that has been used for songs, dances and sets of variations.

Folia or Folía may also refer to:

Music

Composition
Folias, by Alessandro Piccinini (1566–c.1638)
Folias, by Francesco Corbetta (c.1615–1681)
Folia, by Giovanni Paolo Foscarini (fl. 1621–1649)
Folias, by Lucas Ruis Ribayaz (c.1626–1667)
Folias, by Antonio de Cabezón (1510–1566)
Folia, by Bernardo Storace (1637–1707)
Folias, by Gaspar Sanz (1640–1710)
Folias, for guitar, by Francisco Guerau (1649–1721)
Folias (a 3), by Andrea Falconieri (1650)
"La folia" Violin Sonata Op. 5 No. 12 in D minor, by Corelli (1653–1713)
"La folia", for viola, by Marin Marais (1656-1728)
Variations on 'La Folia', by Alessandro Scarlatti (1660–1725)
La Folia, by Antonio Vivaldi (1678–1741)
"La Folia" Concerto grosso after Corelli, No. 12 in D minor Geminiani (1687–1762)
Folias de España, 20 variations and fugue for guitar, by Manuel Ponce (1930)
La Folia Variants, by Nils Vigeland (born 1950)
Folias, for guitar & orchestra by Roberto Sierra (2004)

Albums
La Folia, a 1982 album by Atrium Musicae de Madrid, Gregorio Paniagua
Folias & Canarios, a 1994 album by Jordi Savall
Folías (album), a 2007 album by el Guincho
Folias, a 2011 recording by Nils Mönkemeyer
La Folia, a 2014 album by Jordi Savall

Other uses 
 Folia (tunicate), a genus of animals in the family Oikopleuridae
 La Folia Barockorchester, a 2007 chamber music ensemble based in Dresden
 Folias Flute and Guitar Duo, an American chamber music duo

See also
 Folium (disambiguation), the plural of folia